The Lonely Boys is a fiction book by Swedish author Mats Olsson about a young rhythm 'n' pop band from the south of Sweden in 1965.

Per Gessle (of Roxette fame) was asked by Mats Olsson to write a soundtrack to follow the book, so the band The Lonely Boys came into existence. The debut album by this 1965 fictitious band was released in December 1995. The band consisted of members from the two Swedish pop bands Wilmer X (Hellberg and Holst) and Gyllene Tider (Gessle, Persson and Andersson).

The band went to great lengths to create an authentic 1960s sound, from the lyrical content (Why did Adam have to fall in love with Eve) to the authentic instruments and amplifiers used in the recording process. The album is set out as two sides of an LP (although it was available on a promotional LP in Sweden), including crackles of the needle on the turntable and a pause in between the two sides as the record is turned over.

Band members
The Lonely Boys consists of:
 Lasse Göransson (a.k.a. Thomas Holst) on Bass guitar
 Roland Bergström (a.k.a. Mats "MP" Persson) on Vox- & Hammond organs, Piano
 Kalle Johansson (a.k.a. Micke "Syd" Andersson) on drums and tambourine
 Thomas Nyberg (a.k.a. Per Gessle) on rhythm guitar and vocals
 Richard Andersson (a.k.a. Nisse Hellberg) on lead guitar, harmonica, maraccas, tambourine and vocals

The Lonely Boys (album)

Track listing 
All tracks contain lead vocals by Per Gessle and Nisse Hellberg, except where noted.

External links
 The Lonely Boys
 Pearls of Per (lyrics)

Swedish novels
Book soundtracks
Fiction set in 1965
Swedish-language novels
Swedish historical novels